Southpaw Grammar is the fifth studio album by English alternative rock singer Morrissey, released on 28 August 1995 by record labels RCA in the UK and Reprise in the US.

The album charted at number 4 in the UK and number 66 in the US, but received a mixed response from critics. The singles lifted from the album were "Dagenham Dave" (which reached number 26 in the UK Singles Chart in August 1995) and "The Boy Racer" (which reached number 36 in December).

Content 
The nature of the album is different from past Morrissey releases, such as the inclusion of two tracks which surpass the ten-minute mark, the near two-and-a-half-minute drum solo courtesy of Spencer Cobrin which opens the track "The Operation" and the sampling of a Shostakovich1 symphony. AllMusic described it as Morrissey's "art rock album, complete with strings, drum solos and two ten-minute songs."

Musical style 
Spin magazine described the album's musical style as "[differing] from the crushed flowers studio formalisations of last year's Vauxhall and I, building instead on the earlier Your Arsenal, Morrissey's sly, unexpected blending of rockabilly and glam."

Release 
Southpaw Grammar was released on 28 August 1995 by record labels RCA in the UK and Reprise in the US. On its release Southpaw Grammar was an eyebrow-raiser for fans and critics alike.

On 27 April 2009 Sony BMG released a remastered version of Southpaw Grammar in the UK. This version included a substantially altered running order, three previously unreleased tracks, "Honey, You Know Where to Find Me", "You Should Have Been Nice to Me" and "Fantastic Bird" (the last of which dates from the Your Arsenal sessions) as well as a single B-side "Nobody Loves Us". The digital version from iTunes Store adds live versions of "London" and "Billy Budd", recorded in London.

Reception 

The critical reception to Southpaw Grammar was mixed. Richard Cromelin of the Los Angeles Times described it as "the most musically dynamic album from the Messiah of Moans since he revitalized British rock with The Smiths in the mid-'80s". Al Weisel of Rolling Stone qualified it as Morrissey's "most powerful solo outing to date". Qs Phil Sutcliffe wrote that Southpaw Grammar "shapes up as the kind of severe work that accrues more honour than love, more favourable comments than sales to record-buyers", and the magazine later listed it as one of the top 50 albums of 1995. In 1999, critic Ned Raggett ranked the album at number 79 on his list of "The Top 136 or So Albums of the Nineties".

According to Uncut magazine: "On its release, Southpaw Grammar seemed to be the point where the Great British Public officially fell out of love with Morrissey. The casual Smiths fan had all but lost interest while even the scary Moz obsessives were a little puzzled." Blenders Tony Power called it an "ugly, noisy, grumpy album, recorded while Britpop stole Moz's thunder and the Mike Joyce court case loomed." Andrzej Lukowski of Drowned in Sound was more favourable in his retrospective assessment, writing that the album "is in some ways the most daring thing the ex-Smith has ever put his name to... [...] At the same time it's also pretty craven, in that it dilutes the impact of its three key tracks – 'The Teachers Are Afraid of the Pupils', 'The Operation' and 'Southpaw', dark, sprawling semi-instrumentals dominated by the remarkable drumming of Spencer James Cobrin – with lightweight fluff like 'Dagenham Dave' and 'The Boy Racer'." Brad Shoup of Stereogum named it Morrissey's "peak" and "quintessential document".

Track listing 

 Note: Given the 2009 re-release CD is a mock up of a vinyl record, the words "the heart is a lonely hunter" appear on the runout grooves.

Personnel 
 Morrissey – vocals
 Alain Whyte – guitar, backing vocals
 Boz Boorer – guitar
 Jonny Bridgwood – bass guitar
 Spencer James Cobrin – drums

 Technical

 Steve Lillywhite – production

Charts

Certifications

References

External links 
 

Morrissey albums
1995 albums
Albums produced by Steve Lillywhite
RCA Records albums